Fui Yiu Ha New Village or Fui Yiu Ha San Tsuen, also referred to as Fui Yiu Ha Resite Area or simply as Fui Yiu Ha Village or Fui Yiu Ha Tsuen, is a village in Sha Tin District, Hong Kong.

Administration
Fui Yiu Ha Resite Area is a recognized village under the New Territories Small House Policy.

History
Fui Yiu Ha San Tsuen was relocated from Fui Yiu Ha Tsuen in 1981.

See also
 Kau Yeuk (Sha Tin)

References

External links

 Delineation of area of existing village Fui Yiu Ha and Tse Uk (Sha Tin) for election of resident representative (2019 to 2022)

Villages in Sha Tin District, Hong Kong